The Bankruptcy Act 1869 (32 & 33 Vict c 71) was an Act of the Parliament of the United Kingdom.

Section 32 established the first statutory regime for preferential debts in bankruptcy, between local rates, taxes, wages and salaries of clerks, servants, labourers and workers.

See also
Bankruptcy in the United Kingdom
History of bankruptcy law
United Kingdom insolvency law

References

C W Lovesy. The Bankruptcy Act, 1869, The Debtors Act, 1869, The Bankruptcy Repeal and Insolvent Court Act, 1869. Knight & Company. Fleet Street, London. 1870. Google Books
Henry Philip Roche and William Hazlitt. The Law and Practice in Bankruptcy: Comprising the Bankruptcy Act, 1869; the Debtors Act, 1869; the Insolvent Debtors and Bankruptcy Repeal Act, 1869: Together with the General Rules and Orders in Bankruptcy, at Common Law and in the County Courts: with the Practice on Procedure, Copious Notes, References, and a Very Full Index. Stevens & Haynes. London. 1873. Google Books.
Henry Philip Roche and William Hazlitt. The Bankruptcy Act, 1869: The Debtors Act, 1869; the Insolvent Debtors and Bankruptcy Repeal Act, 1869. Stevens & Haynes. London. 1870. Google Books
Treherne, John Thomas. A Practical Treatise on the Bankruptcy Act, 1869, together with so much of the Debtors Act, 1869, and the Bankruptcy Repeal and Insolvent Court Act, 1869, as relates to Bankruptcy. Shaw and Sons. Fetter Lane, London. 1870. Google Books.
Pitt-Taylor, Frank. The Bankruptcy Act, 1869, and the Debtors Acts, 1869 & 1878. Second Edition. William Maxwell and Son. London. 1880. Google Books.
John Scott. Costs in Bankruptcy and Liquidation, under the Bankruptcy Act, 1869. Stevens & Sons. 1873. Google Books
Weightman, Turner Thomas. The New Bankruptcy Act, 1869, together with the Act for the Abolition of Imprisonment for Debt. George Routledge and Sons. London and New York. 1869. Google Books.
Josiah William Smith. A Manual Relating to Bankruptcy & Insolvency, and Imprisonment for Debt; comprising  The New Statute Law. Stevens and Sons. Chancery Lane, London. 1873. Google Books

Insolvency law of the United Kingdom
United Kingdom Acts of Parliament 1869